Hurry Up may refer to:

Songs 
"Hurry Up" (Che'Nelle song), 2007
"Hurry Up", by Mýa from Moodring
"Hurry Up", by Ritchie Valens from Ritchie

Other uses 
"Hurry Up", an episode (and character) from Stoppit and Tidyup
Hurry-up offense in American football
Hurry-up Peak, North Cascades mountains, Washington